Mario Tankoski (born 28 August 1998) is a Macedonian handball player for RK Eurofarm Pelister and the North Macedonia national team.

He participated at the 2017 Men's Junior World Handball Championship.

References

External links

1998 births
Living people
Macedonian male handball players
Sportspeople from Struga